Plesiolena jorgelina is a species of mygalomorph spiders in the family Actinopodidae. It is found in Chile.

References

Actinopodidae
Spiders described in 1994
Endemic fauna of Chile